Indium(III) sulfide (Indium sesquisulfide, Indium sulfide (2:3), Indium (3+) sulfide) is the inorganic compound with the formula In2S3.

It has a "rotten egg" odor characteristic of sulfur compounds, and produces hydrogen sulfide gas when reacted with mineral acids.

Three different structures ("polymorphs") are known: yellow, α-In2S3 has a defect cubic structure, red β-In2S3 has a defect spinel, tetragonal, structure, and γ-In2S3 has a layered structure. The red, β, form is considered to be the most stable form at room temperature, although the yellow form may be present depending on the method of production.  In2S3 is attacked by acids and by sulfide. It is slightly soluble in Na2S.

Indium sulfide was the first indium compound ever described, being reported in 1863. Reich and Richter determined the existence of indium as a new element from the sulfide precipitate.

Structure and properties
In2S3 features tetrahedral In(III) centers linked to four sulfido ligands.

α-In2S3 has a defect cubic structure.  The polymorph undergoes a phase transition at 420 °C and converts to the spinel structure of β-In2S3.  Another phase transition at 740 °C produces the layered γ-In2S3 polymorph.

β-In2S3 has a defect spinel structure.  The sulfide anions are closely packed in layers, with octahedrally-coordinated In(III) cations present within the layers, and tetrahedrally-coordinated In(III) cations between them.  A portion of the tetrahedral interstices are vacant, which leads to the defects in the spinel.

β-In2S3 has two subtypes.  In the T-In2S3 subtype, the tetragonally-coordinated vacancies are in an ordered arrangement, whereas the vacancies in C-In2S3 are disordered.  The disordered subtype of β-In2S3 shows activity for photocatalytic H2 production with a noble metal cocatalyst, but the ordered subtype does not.

β-In2S3 is an N-type semiconductor with an optical band gap of 2.1 eV. It has been proposed to replace the hazardous cadmium sulfide, CdS, as a buffer layer in solar cells, and as an additional semiconductor to increase the performance of TiO2-based photovoltaics.

The unstable γ-In2S3 polymorph has a layered structure.

Production
Indium sulfide is usually prepared by direct combination of the elements.

Production from volatile complexes of indium and sulfur, for example dithiocarbamates (e.g. Et2InIIIS2CNEt2), has been explored for vapor deposition techniques.

Thin films of the beta complex can be grown by chemical spray pyrolysis.  Solutions of In(III) salts and organic sulfur compounds (often thiourea) are sprayed onto preheated glass plates, where the chemicals react to form thin films of indium sulfide.  Changing the temperature at which the chemicals are deposited and the In:S ratio can affect the optical band gap of the film.

Single-walled indium sulfide nanotubes can be formed in the laboratory, by the use of two solvents (one in which the compound dissolves poorly and one in which it dissolves well).  There is partial replacement of the sulfido ligands with O2−, and the compound forms thin nanocoils, which self-assemble into arrays of nanotubes with diameters on the order of 10 nm, and walls approximately 0.6 nm thick. The process mimics protein crystallization.

Safety 
The β-In2S3 polymorph, in powdered form, can irritate eyes, skin and respiratory organs.  It is toxic if swallowed, but can be handled safely under conventional laboratory conditions.  It should be handled with gloves, and care should be taken to keep from inhaling the compound, and to keep it from contact with the eyes.

Applications

Photovoltaic and Photocatalytic 
There is considerable interest in using In2S3 to replace the semiconductor CdS (cadmium sulfide) in photoelectronic devices.  β-In2S3 has a tunable band gap, which makes it attractive for photovoltaic applications, and it shows promise when used in conjunction with TiO2 in solar panels, indicating that it could replace CdS in that application as well. Cadmium sulfide is toxic and must be deposited with a chemical bath, but indium(III) sulfide shows few adverse biological effects and can be deposited as a thin film through less hazardous methods.

Thin films β-In2S3 can be grown with varying band gaps, which make them widely applicable as photovoltaic semiconductors, especially in heterojunction solar cells.

Plates coated with beta-In2S3 nanoparticles can be used efficiently for PEC (photoelectrochemical) water splitting.

Biomedical 
A preparation of indium sulfide made with the radioactive 113In can be used as a lung scanning agent for medical imaging.  It is taken up well by lung tissues, but does not accumulate there.

Other 
In2S3 nanoparticles luminesce in the visible spectrum.  Preparing In2S3 nanoparticles in the presence of other heavy metal ions creates highly efficient blue, green, and red phosphors, which can be used in projectors and instrument displays.

References

General references
WebElements

Sulfides
Indium compounds
Semiconductor materials